Eucalyptus scias, known as the large-fruited red mahogany, is a species of small, straggly to medium-sized tree that is endemic to the high rainfall coastal areas of New South Wales. It has rough, fibrous bark on the trunk and branches, lance-shaped adult leaves, flower buds in groups of three or seven, white flowers and cup-shaped, conical or bell-shaped fruit.

Description
It has fibrous grey or brown bark in long slabs with shallow longitudinal furrows. Flowering has been recorded from January to February and the flowers are white.

Taxonomy and naming
Eucalyptus scias was first formally described in 1990 by Lawrie Johnson and Ken Hill in the journal Telopea from specimens collected by Ian Brooker in Ku-ring-gai Chase National Park in 1971. The specific epithet (scias) is from the ancient Greek skias meaning "a shade", referring to the broad-leaved crown of this species.

In the same journal, Johnson and Hill described three subspecies, apoda, callimastha and scias. Two of the subspecies have been accepted by the Australian Plant Census:
 Eucalyptus scias subsp. apoda L.A.S.Johnson & K.D.Hill, is commonly known as the Tenterfield red mahogany and is usually a poorly-formed tree with flower buds in groups of three;
 Eucalyptus scias L.A.S.Johnson & K.D.Hillsubsp. scias L.A.S.Johnson & K.D.Hill is a medium-sized tree that has flower buds in groups of seven.

Distribution and habitat
The large-fruited red mahogany grows in forests on soils of medium fertility. Subspecies apoda grows on soils derived from granite on the ranges east of Tenterfield. Subspecies scias is mainly found in near-coastal areas between Cessnock and Narooma.

References

scias
Myrtales of Australia
Flora of New South Wales
Trees of Australia
Plants described in 1990